Matango is a small town in Ituri Province in eastern Democratic Republic of the Congo. It is located several kilometres to the northeast by road of Beni.

External links
Maplandia World Gazetteer

Populated places in Ituri Province